KWKZ (106.1 FM, "C106") is a radio station with studios located in Cape Girardeau, Missouri.

External links
 
 
 

WKZ